FC Sever Murmansk was a Russian association football club from Murmansk, founded in 1961. It played professionally from 1961 to 1984 and again from 2008 until 2013/14 season, after which it was dissolved due to financial problems. It played in the second-highest Soviet First League in 1961 and 1962. Until 1965 it was called Tralflotovets Murmansk.

External links
Official Website 

Association football clubs established in 1961
Association football clubs disestablished in 2014
Defunct football clubs in Russia
Sport in Murmansk
1961 establishments in Russia